Shannon College of Hotel Management was founded in 1951 as Ireland's first designated College of Hotel Management. Since 2015 it is fully incorporated into the University of Galway. The college was founded by Dr. Brendan O'Regan and is based in Shannon Airport, County Clare. It was set up with input from Aer Rianta. Shannon College offers programmes at Foundation, Certificate , Degree and Masters Level. Shannon College also offers a range of executive education and short programmes. Shannon College has a long-standing relationship with industry, with hotel partners located all over the world. Graduates of Shannon College are also recognised by the Institute of Hospitality (IoH), the International Hotel and Restaurant Association and the Irish Hospitality Institute.

From 1951 until 1991, the college offered a diploma in hotel management. In 1991, the college began its relationship with University College Galway which saw Shannon offer the BComm in Hotel Management. In 1993 the diploma was validated by NCEA (forerunner of HETAC). In 2000, the college became a recognised college of the National University of Ireland.

In 1991, the process of integrating the college into the University of Galway was first mooted. It commenced in 2004 and developed additional urgency since Shannon Airport was made independent of Aer Rianta and Dublin Airport. From 2009, Shannon was involved in an alliance with the University of Galway, and since 2015 is fully incorporated into the university. Shannon College of Hotel Management is now part of the College of Business, Public Policy and Law of the University of Galway. This integration was formally marked by the Minister for Education Jan O'Sullivan TD at an event held in Shannon College on 9 November 2015. All staff of Shannon College of Hotel Management are now staff of the University of Galway and all students of Shannon College of Hotel Management are students of the University of Galway.

Shannon College currently offer the following programmes:
- International Foundation Business Programme 
- Bachelor of Business Studies in International Hotel Management 
- Bachelor of Commerce in International Hotel Management 
- MSc in Business & Hospitality 
- MSc in Global Hospitality Management and Intercultural Communication
- MSc in Hospitality Performance, Revenue and Asset Management
- Postgraduate Certificate in Hospitality and Leadership

Students of the BComm in International Hotel Management spend three years at the Shannon College of Hotel Management Campus and the fourth year at the University of Galway campus.

Since 2010 Graduates of the BBS degree programme are entitled to exemptions for ACCA accountancy exams.

April 2012 saw Shannon College of Hotel Management Students Win the Irish Hospitality Institute Business Management Games

Graduation takes place each year in Spring.

References

1951 establishments in Ireland
Buildings and structures of the University of Galway
Educational institutions established in 1951
Universities and colleges in the Republic of Ireland